James Kelley Washington (born August 21, 1979) is a former American Football wide receiver and special teamer. He was drafted 65th overall by the Cincinnati Bengals in the third round of the 2003 NFL Draft. He played college football at Tennessee.

Washington has previously been a member of the New England Patriots, Baltimore Ravens, Philadelphia Eagles, and the San Diego Chargers.

Early years
Washington was born in Stephens City, Virginia, where he attended Sherando High School, and was a letterman in football, basketball, and baseball. In football, he was a two-way starter as a quarterback and defensive back and as a senior he was an All-State selection. He twice led his team to the Virginia Class AA-Division 4 State Championship game, though the Warriors lost both times.

Baseball career
He was taken in the 10th round of the June 1997 professional baseball draft by the Florida Marlins and signed as a shortstop. Washington spent four years in the minor leagues, often rooming with future All-Star pitcher Josh Beckett. He never played higher than Class A.

College career
Washington spent two seasons at the University of Tennessee. As a 22-year-old freshman in 2001, he caught 70 passes for 1080 yards and seven touchdowns and made the freshman All-American team. In 2001, he etched his name in the Tennessee records book with 256 receiving yards on 11 catches in the regular season matchup with LSU.

Considered a lock to be a first-round pick if he left early, Washington stayed for his sophomore year but was limited to four games due to injuries. After missing the first two games of that 2002 season with a knee sprain, and suffered a concussion October 12 at Georgia that sidelined him for the remainder of the season. He underwent surgery on November 19 to fuse two vertebrae in his neck.

Washington finished his two-year career with 93 catches for 1523 yards and eight touchdowns. He was an Arts and sciences major.

Professional career

Cincinnati Bengals
He was drafted 65th overall by the Cincinnati Bengals in the 3rd round of the 2003 draft. He never got much playing time while in Cincinnati, recording just 893 yards and 9 touchdowns in 4 seasons. In Cincinnati, he was famous for his signature "Squirrel" dance after scoring touchdowns. He was released following the 2006 season.

New England Patriots

On March 11, 2007, Washington agreed to a five-year deal with the New England Patriots, reuniting him with his college teammate and fellow wide receiver Donté Stallworth. The deal, with a $300,000 signing bonus and a $4-million bonus due in the 2008, could be worth as much as $22 million over five years.  While Washington had not been used as a wide receiver by the Patriots, he had seen time on special teams, blocking a punt against the New York Jets. He had a catch for three yards in 2009. On February 29, 2008, Washington was re-signed by the Patriots under a new contract.

Washington was released by the Patriots on February 17, 2009.  He visited the New York Jets on February 18, and the Buffalo Bills on February 24, continuing the cycle of players between AFC East teams.

Baltimore Ravens
The Baltimore Ravens invited Washington to an offseason mini-camp to try out for the team, competing against fellow veteran, free-agent receivers Jerry Porter and Tab Perry. Washington outperformed Porter and Perry, and on May 14, 2009, Washington agreed to terms on a contract with the Ravens.
During the 2009 season, set career highs across the board, with 31 receptions, 431 yards, and two touchdowns.

Philadelphia Eagles
Washington was signed by the Philadelphia Eagles on July 31, 2010. Washington was released by the Eagles on September 5, 2010, after failing to make the 53-man roster.

San Diego Chargers
The San Diego Chargers signed Washington to a short-term contract on November 4, 2010. He had 13 catches for 173 yards and a touchdown against his former team, the Cincinnati Bengals.

References

External links
San Diego Chargers bio
Philadelphia Eagles bio
New England Patriots bio

Kelley Washington - Stats, News, Photos - ESPN

1979 births
Living people
People from Stephens City, Virginia
Players of American football from Virginia
American football wide receivers
Tennessee Volunteers football players
Cincinnati Bengals players
New England Patriots players
Baltimore Ravens players
Philadelphia Eagles players
San Diego Chargers players